There have been 24 Formula One drivers from Belgium, of whom Jacky Ickx and Thierry Boutsen were the most successful ones as the only Belgians to win races. The most recent Belgian driver is Stoffel Vandoorne, who raced for McLaren in 2017 and 2018.

Former drivers

In the early years of Formula One, Belgium was well represented with a highlight in 1953 when there were no less than seven Belgian drivers taking part in the championship. The first victory for a Belgian only occurred in 1968 however, when Jacky Ickx won the French Grand Prix. Ickx went on to win eight races in total, reaching the podium 25 times and becoming the runner-up in both the 1969 and 1970 seasons. The only other driver to win a Grand Prix was Thierry Boutsen, who won three races during his two-year stint with Williams-Renault in 1989–1990 and managed to reach the podium 15 times.

Besides Ickx and Boutsen, the only other Belgian drivers to reach the podium are Olivier Gendebien (who scored two podium finishes), Lucien Bianchi, Paul Frère and Willy Mairesse who each finished on the podium once.

Bertrand Gachot, who was born in Luxembourg as the son of French-German parents carried a French passport but raced under a Belgian FIA Super Licence until 1991, from the 1992 Formula One season he changed to a French licence.

All-time table

See also 
List of Formula One Grand Prix winners

Notes

References